Dolichopoda azami, the Azam's cave-cricket, is a species of cave cricket within the family Rhaphidophoridae. The species distribution is in France in the Southern Alps and in Italy in Piedmont, Liguria and Lombardia, where it lives in various dark habitats that have stable tempuratures and high humidity. Such habitats include rocky forests, caves, damaged bridges or aqueducts, and abandoned/disused buildings at elevations of 120 to 1,940 metres. It lives in these habitats during the day and is primarily active at night.

Dolichopoda azami has been assessed as 'Least concern' by the IUCN Red List as it has no known major threats, is common, and occurs in at least 1 protected area. Direct human threats on the species are rare and are believed to not severely impact the species population.

Subspecies 
 Dolichopoda azami azami  (Found in southeastern France)
 Dolichopoda azami ligustica  (Found in southern Piedmont, north-western Liguria, and the French part of Roya valley)
 Dolichopoda azami septentrionalis  (Found in a small area in Lanzo valley, easternmost caves close to Bergamo, and close to Turin)

References 

Insects described in 1893
Rhaphidophoridae
IUCN Red List least concern species
Fauna of France
Fauna of Italy